The 2018 British Columbia Scotties Tournament of Hearts, the provincial women's curling championship for British Columbia, was held January 2–7 at the Victoria Curling Club in Victoria, British Columbia.  The winning Kesa Van Osch team will represent British Columbia at the 2018 Scotties Tournament of Hearts.

Qualification Process

Teams
The teams were listed as follows:

Round-robin standings

January 2
Draw 1
Brown 7-5 Donaldson
Gushulak 10-3 Ludwar
Slattery 8-7 Gyles
Thompson 8-5 Van Osch

January 3
Draw 2
Thompson 7-4 Ludwar
Donaldson 6-5 Slattery 
Van Osch 7-6 Gushulak
Brown 5-4 Gyles

Draw 3
Van Osch 5-4 Donaldson 
Gushulak 6-5 Gyles
Thompson 6-5 Brown  
Slattery 9-4 Ludwar

January 4
Draw 4
Slattery 2-5 Gushulak
Van Osch 1-8 Brown
Gyles 5-4 Ludwar
Thompson 10-7 Donaldson

Draw 5
Brown 11-3 Ludwar 
Thompson 8-2 Gyles
Gushulak 8-4 Donaldson
Van Osch 6-3 Slattery

January 5
Draw 6
Van Osch 8-3 Gyles
Donaldson 5-6 Ludwar
Thompson 4-5 Slattery
Brown 4-9 Gushulak

Draw 7
Gushulak 6-7 Thompson
Brown 10-3 Slattery
Ludwar 4-9 Van Osch
Donaldson 7-4 Gyles

Playoffs

1 vs. 2
January 6, 2:00pm

3 vs. 4
January 6, 9:00pm

Semifinal
January 7, 11:00am

Final
January 7, 4:00pm

References

External links
Official website

BC Scotties Tournament of Hearts
2018 in British Columbia
January 2018 sports events in Canada
Curling in British Columbia
Sports competitions in Victoria, British Columbia
21st century in Victoria, British Columbia